Whiteoak Township is one of the seventeen townships of Highland County, Ohio, United States. As of the 2010 census the population was 1,371, of whom 1,011 lived in the unincorporated portions of the township.

Geography
Located in the southwestern part of the county, it borders the following townships:
Hamer Township - north
New Market Township - northeast
Concord Township - east
Eagle Township, Brown County - southeast
Washington Township, Brown County - southwest
Clay Township - west

The village of Mowrystown is located in southern Whiteoak Township.

Name and history
It is the only Whiteoak Township statewide.

Government
The township is governed by a three-member board of trustees, who are elected in November of odd-numbered years to a four-year term beginning on the following January 1. Two are elected in the year after the presidential election and one is elected in the year before it. There is also an elected township fiscal officer, who serves a four-year term beginning on April 1 of the year after the election, which is held in November of the year before the presidential election. Vacancies in the fiscal officership or on the board of trustees are filled by the remaining trustees.

References

External links
County website

Townships in Highland County, Ohio
Townships in Ohio